Mass media in Namibia includes radio, television, and online and print formats.

Overview
Although Namibia's population is fairly small, the country has a diverse choice of media; in 2010 two TV stations, 19 radio stations (without counting community stations), 5 daily newspapers, several weeklies and special publications compete for the attention of the audience. As of 2014, Namibia had 3 television stations, 13 newspapers, and 25 radio stations. Additionally, a mentionable amount of foreign media, especially South African, is available. Online media are mostly based on print publication contents. Namibia has a state-owned Press Agency, called NAMPA. Overall  500 journalists work in the country.

Compared to neighbouring countries, Namibia has a large degree of media freedom. Over the past years, the country usually ranked in the upper quarter of the Press Freedom Index of Reporters without Borders, reaching position 21 in 2010, being on par with Canada and the best-positioned African country. The African Media Barometer shows similarly positive results. However, as in other countries, there is still mentionable influence of representatives of state and economy on media in Namibia. In 2009, Namibia dropped to position 36 on the Press Freedom Index. In 2013, it was 19th. In 2014 it ranked 22nd In 2021, Namibia ranked 24th in the world

Media and journalists in Namibia are represented by the Namibian chapter of the Media Institute of Southern Africa and the Editors' Forum of Namibia. An independent media ombudsman was appointed in 2009 to prevent a state-controlled media council.

History
The first newspaper in Namibia was the German-language Windhuker Anzeiger, founded 1898 by attorney George Wasserfall. It mainly reported on movements of the German imperial forces, the Schutztruppe. After the establishment of the newspaper the German colonial administration used it as a government gazette.

During German rule, the newspapers mainly reflected the living reality and the view of the white German-speaking minority. The black majority was ignored or depicted as a threat. During South African rule, the white bias continued, with mentionable influence of the Pretoria government on the "South West African" media system. Independent newspapers were seen as a menace to the existing order, critical journalists threatened.

Publications

Current daily newspapers are the private publications The Namibian (English and other languages), Die Republikein (Afrikaans), Allgemeine Zeitung (German) and Namibian Sun (English) as well as the state-owned New Era (predominantly English).  Except for the most widely circulated newspaper, The Namibian, which is owned by a trust, the other mentioned private newspapers are part of the Democratic Media Holdings.

Weekly publications are the tabloid Informanté owned by TrustCo, Windhoek Observer, Namibia Economist, as well as the regional Namib Times. Current affairs magazines include Insight Namibia, Vision2030 Focus magazine and Prime FOCUS. Monthly publications are Sister Namibia magazine, the longest running NGO magazine in Namibia and Namibia Sport, the only national sport magazine. Furthermore, the print market is complemented with party publications, student newspapers and PR publications.

Radio

Radio was introduced in 1969 with Radio Owambo, an FM channel destined for the indigenous Ovambo people. However, people in Namibia already owned short wave radio sets to receive international channels, such that FM radio broadcasts were initially not widely received.

Today the Namibian Broadcasting Corporation (NBC) is the public broadcaster and offers a "National Radio" in English and nine language services in locally spoken languages. The nine private radio stations in the country are mainly English-language channels, except for Kosmos 94.1 (Afrikaans) and Radio Omulunga (Ovambo).

Current 
99FM - Namibia
 Kanaal 7/Channel 7
 Katutura Community Radio
 JACC FM
NBC
 UNAM Radio, University of Namibia
Radiowave FM
Fresh FM
Kosmos FM
Eagle FM
NBC Local Language Raio

Defunct
 Voice of Namibia, 1966-1990

Television

Television service in Namibia started in 1981 with rebroadcasts of programs of the South African Broadcasting Corporation (SABC). The service was at least a day late as the cassettes had to be flown in from South Africa, and it was available only in the capital Windhoek. Later TV was also available in Oshakati and in Walvis Bay, and over time local content was added.

Local TV Channels:

 Namibian Broadcasting Corporation
 One Africa Television
 DSTV

See also
 Telecommunications in Namibia
 Communications Regulatory Authority of Namibia
 Namibia Press Agency
 
 Regional Media Institute of Southern Africa, headquartered in Windhoek, Namibia
 Windhoek Declaration of press freedom, 1991
 Media of South Africa, some consumed in Namibia

References

Bibliography
 
 
  (Includes broadcasting)

External links

 
 DMOZ. Namibia: News and Media

 
Namibia
Namibia